Ivar Aavatsmark (2 October 1916, Høylandet – 29 August 2004) was a Norwegian corporate executive and forester from Høylandet. He was director of the Norwegian Forest Owners Association for forty years, between 1942 and 1982. He was one of the architects behind the Norske Skog corporation that was started by the association.  He died in 2004.

References 

1916 births
2004 deaths
People from Høylandet
20th-century Norwegian businesspeople
Norske Skog people